John M. Walker (1905-1976) was a Republican politician from Pennsylvania. Born on January 15, 1905, in Leechburg, Pennsylvania, he was the son of a general manager of Allegheny Steel Company. Walker studied at Culver Military Academy before serving in the infantry in World War I. After obtaining a degree from University of Pittsburgh's School of Business Administration, he attended the University of Pittsburgh School of Law, graduating in 1925. Following his education, Walker practiced law in Leechburg.

In 1931, he was appointed Special Deputy Attorney General to Governor Gifford Pinchot. From 1939 through 1954, he served in the State Senate, representing parts of Allegheny County. He gained a reputation for his combative anti-tax viewpoints while in the Senate. He later served as a member of Allegheny County's Board of Commissioners. Walker won the party's 1958 primary for Lieutenant Governor, but was part of a losing ticket with Arthur McGonigle.

Walker was appointed Judge of the Courts of Allegheny County in 1964, and retired in 1968. He died on December 10, 1976, at Shadyside Hospital in Pittsburgh.

References

External links
https://web.archive.org/web/20110104164546/http://politicalgraveyard.com/geo/PA/AL5.html The Political Graveyard
Pennsylvania Politics Today and Yesterday

1905 births
1976 deaths
Culver Academies alumni
Pennsylvania Republicans